Rhinelander is a city in and the county seat of Oneida County, Wisconsin, United States. The population was 8,285 at the 2020 census.

History
The area that eventually became the city of Rhinelander was originally called Pelican Rapids by early settlers, named for the stretch of rapids just above the convergence of the Wisconsin and Pelican Rivers. Around 1870, Anderson W. Brown of Stevens Point and Anson P. Vaughn traveled up the Wisconsin River  to cruise timber for Brown's father, E. D. Brown. Upon arriving at the meeting point of the Wisconsin and Pelican Rivers at the site of John Curran's trading post, and seeing the high banks along the rapids and the excellent pine stands, Anderson Brown envisioned a mill town with a lumber mill powered by the waters of the Wisconsin River. Brown's vision did not come to fruition for some years, but after subsequent expeditions with others, including his brother and Rhinelander's first mayor, Webster Brown, the brothers managed to convince their father and uncle to purchase the land from the federal government and build a town. In its charter, the city was named Rhinelander after Frederic W. Rhinelander of New York, who was president of the Milwaukee, Lake Shore and Western Railroad at the time. This was part of a bid by the Brown brothers to induce the railroad to extend a spur to the location to further their lumbering business. Ultimately, after over 10 years of negotiations, the Brown family agreed to convey half their land holdings in the area to the railroad in exchange for a rail line to their future city. In 1882, the railroad line from present-day Monico to Rhinelander was completed, jump starting the development of Rhinelander as the commercial hub of the region.

Geography
Rhinelander is located at  (45.639515, −89.412086).

Climate 
Rhinelander has a warm-summer humid continental climate (Köppen: Dfb). Because of its location, it is prone to Arctic cold snaps, and without the western Föhn winds its winter average is lower than other places in the US at 45 °N even at high elevations. Summers tend to be cooler with some degree of Lake Superior and Lake Michigan influence. Precipitation is still relatively distributed but not as much as other humid climates in the country.

Demographics

2020 census
As of the census of 2020, the population was 8,285. The racial makeup of the city was 90.8% White, 1.6% Native American, 1.2% Black or African American, 0.8% Asian, 0.1% Pacific Islander, 0.8% from other races, and 4.7% from two or more races. Ethnically, the population was 2.5% Hispanic or Latino of any race.

2010 census
As of the census of 2010,  7,798 people, 3,545 households, and 1,876 families resided in the city. The 3,981 housing units averaged . The racial makeup of the city was 95.2% White, 1.0% African American, 1.2% Native American, 0.7% Asian, 0.2% from other races, and 1.6% from two or more races. Hispanics or Latinos of any race were 1.3% of the population.

Of the 3,545 households, 26.9% had children under the age of 18 living with them, 34.6% were married couples living together, 13.5% had a female householder with no husband present, 4.9% had a male householder with no wife present, and 47.1% were not families. About 39.5% of all households were made up of individuals, and 17.1% had someone living alone who was 65 years of age or older. The average household size was 2.10 and the average family size was 2.79.

The median age in the city was 40 years; 21.2% of residents were under the age of 18; 9.5% were between the ages of 18 and 24; 25% were from 25 to 44; 25% were from 45 to 64; and 19.1% were 65 years of age or older. The gender makeup of the city was 47.0% male and 53.0% female.

2000 census
As of the census of 2000,  7,735 people, 3,214 households, and 1,860 families resided in the city. The population density was 1,002.5 people per square mile (386.9/km2). The 3,430 housing units averaged 444.5 per square mile (171.5/km2). The racial makeup of the city was 96.83% White, 0.39% African American, 0.96% Native American, 0.32% Asian, 0.12% Pacific Islander, 0.23% from other races, and 1.15% from two or more races. Hispanics or Latinos of any race were 0.72% of the population.

Of the 3,214 households, 28.9% had children under the age of 18 living with them, 41.2% were married couples living together, 12.3% had a female householder with no husband present, and 42.1% were not families. About 36.3% of all households were made up of individuals, and 17.7% had someone living alone who was 65 years of age or older. The average household size was 2.23 and the average family size was 2.90.

In the city, the population was distributed as 23.4% under the age of 18, 8.3% from 18 to 24, 27.7% from 25 to 44, 20.1% from 45 to 64, and 20.5% who were 65 years of age or older. The median age was 39 years. For every 100 females, there were 84.1 males. For every 100 females age 18 and over, there were 80.3 males.

The median income for a household in the city was $29,622, and for a family was $37,629. Males had a median income of $29,750 versus $22,157 for females. The per capita income for the city was $16,047. About 9.4% of families and 12.2% of the population were below the poverty line, including 11.1% of those under age 18 and 9.3% of those age 65 or over.

Government

Rhinelander is the county seat for Oneida County. Kristopher Hanus is the current mayor.

Education
 The Rhinelander School District serves the area.
 Zion Lutheran School is a Christian Pre-K-8 school of the Wisconsin Evangelical Lutheran Synod in Rhinelander.
 The Lake Julia campus of Nicolet Area Technical College is located just outside Rhinelander.
 A University of Wisconsin program, School of the Arts at Rhinelander, took place every summer for 52 years, ending in 2015.

Economy
Rhinelander is a commercial, industrial, and recreation hub for the Northwoods area of Wisconsin.  Because of the forests, lakes, and trails in the area, it is both a summer and winter vacation destination. It has a paper mill and a hospital.

Transportation

Major highways

Airport
Rhinelander-Oneida County Airport (KRHI) serves Rhinelander and the surrounding Oneida county communities with both scheduled commercial jet service and general aviation services. The airport has a 6,799-ft concrete primary runway with approved ILS, GPS and VOR/DME approaches (runway 9-27) and a 5,201-ft asphalt crosswind runway with approved GPS approaches (runway 15-33). In addition, the Rhinelander VORTAC (RHI) navigational facility is located at the field.

Tourism
The Rhinelander area has numerous vacation destinations, offering fishing, boating, canoeing, kayaking, ATVing, mountain biking and hiking, hunting, golfing, cross country skiing and snowshoeing, snowmobiling, and bird watching. It also serves as a main shopping and lodging area for the Northwoods. A popular summer tourist destination is the Pioneer Park Historical Complex, which is open Memorial Day weekend through Labor Day weekend and features many interactive displays and spaces to explore Rhinelander's rich history, including the infamous hodag.

Media
Rhinelander is home to NBC affiliate WJFW-TV. In addition to serving Rhinelander, WJFW-TV also serves the Wausau area. Conversely, Wausau's area stations, including CBS affiliate WSAW-TV and ABC affiliate WAOW, also serve Rhinelander. WXPR, a public radio station at 91.7 FM, is based in Rhinelander.

Culture

Rhinelander is the home of the hodag, a folkloric green and white creature said to stalk the local woods.  The hodag serves as mascot for the city and for Rhinelander High School and Northwoods Community Secondary School.
The Rhinelander Flea Market is held every Wednesday between Labor Day and Memorial Day by the ice arena.
An arts and cultural center is in the former Federal Building downtown. 
Rhinelander is home to the Hodag Country Festival, a country music festival.
Northwoods Pride Festival
Oneida County Fair
Oktoberfest

Museums
ArtStart Art Museum
CCC (Civilian Conservation Corps) Museum
Logging Museum
Rhinelander Historical Society Museum
Rhinelander School Museum

Recreation

Parks
Pioneer Park
Hodag Park
Shepard Park
West Side Park

Golf
Northwood Golf Course
Rhinelander Country Club

Notable people

 Deming Bronson, Medal of Honor recipient
 Webster E. Brown, U.S. Representative
 Elizabeth Burmaster, Wisconsin Superintendeant of Public Instruction and former president of Nicolet Area Technical College
 Jason Doering, former professional football player for the Indianapolis Colts and the New York Giants
 Darrell Einertson, MLB player
 Dan Forsman, professional golfer, winner of five PGA Tour events
 Clarence W. Gilley, Wisconsin State Representative
 Rita Gross, theologian, educator, and writer, grew up on a dairy farm in the Rhinelander area.
 John Heisman, college football's Heisman Trophy namesake, is buried in Rhinelander. A wooden statue honors Heisman at the Rhinelander-Oneida County Airport.
 Walt Kichefski, NFL player
 John Kotz, 1941 NCAA Tournament Most Outstanding Player
 Craig Ludwig, former professional hockey player
 Ashlee Martinson was convicted of murdering her mother and stepfather in 2015.
 Neil McEachin, Wisconsin State Representative and judge
 Bernard N. Moran, Wisconsin State Senator
 T. V. Olsen, author
 Alvin E. O'Konski, U.S. Representative
 Parker Retzlaff, NASCAR Driver
 Arthur M. Rogers, Wisconsin State Representative
 Richard J. Saykally, professor of chemistry, University of California, Berkeley, was born in Rhinelander
 Vanessa Semrow, Miss Wisconsin Teen USA 2002, Miss Teen USA 2002
 Joan Valerie, film actress
 John C. Van Hollen, Wisconsin politician and realtor
 Robert Vito, television journalist
 Dale Wasserman, playwright
 Mike Webster, Pro Football Hall of Fame member
 Jean M. Wilkowski, United States diplomat

 Kathryn Givney, Actress on stage and in films

Images

References

External links

 City of Rhinelander
 Downtown Rhinelander
 Rhinelander Chamber of Commerce
 Sanborn fire insurance maps: 1889 1894 1900 1908 1920

 
Cities in Wisconsin
Cities in Oneida County, Wisconsin
County seats in Wisconsin